The 95th District of the Iowa House of Representatives in the state of Iowa.

Current elected officials
Charlie McClintock is the representative currently representing the district.

Past representatives
The district has previously been represented by:
 Perry L. Christensen, 1971–1973
 Wendell C. Pellett, 1973–1983
 James O. Anderson, 1983–1985
 Michael K. Peterson, 1985–1993
 Harold Van Maanen, 1993–1999
 Jim Van Engelenhoven, 1999–2003
 Mike Reasoner, 2003–2011
 Joel Fry, 2011–2013
 Quentin Stanerson, 2013–2017
 Louie Zumbach, 2017–2021
 Charlie McClintock, 2021–present

References

095